Huitzila is locality in the municipality of Tizayuca, in the state of Hidalgo in central-eastern Mexico. It is located in Tizayuca Valley and is part of Greater Mexico City.

Etymology
Huitzila refers to the Nahuatl term meaning: "Place among the hummingbirds".

Geography
In terms of physiography, it is part of the Trans-Mexican Volcanic Belt, within the subprovince of Lagos and volcanoes of Anáhuac; its terrain includes valley and plain. With regard to hydrography, it is positioned in the Pánuco region, within the Moctezuma River basin, in the Tezontepec River sub-basin. It has a temperate semi-dry climate.

Demographics
In 2020, Huitzila had a population of 5,805 people, which corresponds to 3.45% of the locality's population in which 2,895 were men and 2,910 were women. It also has 1,500 inhabited private homes.

Economy
Huitzila has a low degree of marginalization and a very low degree of social backwardness.

References

Mexico City metropolitan area
Populated places in Hidalgo (state)
Valley of Mexico